Thomas Weathersby Sr. (born July 24, 1944) is an American politician. He is a member of the Mississippi House of Representatives from the 62nd District, being first elected in 1991. He is a member of the Republican party.

References

1944 births
Living people
Republican Party members of the Mississippi House of Representatives
Politicians from Jackson, Mississippi
21st-century American politicians